Lactase-phlorizin hydrolase may refer to:
 Phloretin hydrolase, an enzyme
 Glycosylceramidase, an enzyme